Abomination may refer to:

Abomination (Bible), covering Biblical references
Abomination (Judaism)
Abomination (character), a Marvel Comics supervillain
Abomination (Dune), from Frank Herbert's Dune series, a fetus who has become conscious before birth
Abomination: The Nemesis Project, a 1999 real time strategy computer game
Abomination (novel), a 1998 novel by Robert Swindells
Abomination, a vampire/werewolf hybrid from the game Werewolf: The Apocalypse
The Abomination (Doctor Who), a Dalek species in the Doctor Who science fiction series

See also
Abominable (disambiguation)